Oberon Peak is an isolated nunatak, rising to about 1,250 m, at the head of Uranus Glacier and 8 nautical miles (15 km) north-northwest of Titania Peak in central Alexander Island, Antarctica. First mapped from air photos taken by the Ronne Antarctic Research Expedition (RARE), 1947–48, by Searle of the Falkland Islands Dependencies Survey (FIDS) in 1960. Named by the United Kingdom Antarctic Place-Names Committee (UK-APC) for its association with nearby Uranus Glacier, Oberon being one of the satellites of Uranus.

See also

 Copland Peak
 Lamina Peak
 Giza Peak

Mountains of Alexander Island